Barbora Řezníčková, née Silná (born 8 January 1989) is a Czech-Austrian ice dancing coach and former competitor who represented Austria for most of her career. With Dmitri Matsjuk, she is a four-time Austrian national champion and qualified for the free dance at four ISU Championships. With Juri Kurakin, she won three Austrian national titles and reached the final segment at three ISU Championships.

Personal life 
Silná was born 8 January 1989 in Kroměříž, Czechoslovakia. She became an Austrian citizen by January 2009.

Career

In the Czech Republic 
Silná began learning to skate in 1993. Early in her career, she represented the Czech Republic with Martin Šubrt. In the 2003–04 season, the duo appeared at two ISU Junior Grand Prix events and became the Czech national junior bronze medalists. They were coached by Natalia Vorobieva at TJ Stadion in Brno.

Partnership with Matsjuk 
In 2005, Silná teamed up with Ukrainian-born skater Dmitri Matsjuk to compete on the senior level for Austria. The two won four Austrian national titles from 2006 to 2009 and the silver medal at the 2007 Ondrej Nepela Memorial. They qualified for the free dance at four ISU Championships – 2007 Europeans in Warsaw, Poland; 2008 Europeans in Zagreb, Croatia; 2008 Worlds in Gothenburg, Sweden; and 2009 Europeans in Helsinki, Finland. Their best result, 15th, came in Helsinki. They trained under Jana Hübler at Cottage Engelmann Club in Vienna and in Lyon.

Partnership with Kurakin 
Silná teamed up with Estonian skater Juri Kurakin in 2010. The two decided to represent Austria. In the 2010–11 season, they were coached by Dmitri Sildoja and Vitali Schulz in Dortmund and Vienna. The following season, training under Muriel Zazoui and Romain Haguenauer in Lyon and Graz, they won their first Austrian national title. During the next two seasons, they finished second to Kira Geil / Tobias Eisenbauer at the Austrian Championships. In the 2013–14 season, they switched to Barbara Fusar-Poli in Milan.

Having missed qualifying for the free dance at three ISU Championship, Silná/Kurakin were successful for the first time at the 2015 Europeans in Stockholm, where they finished 18th. At the 2015 Worlds in Shanghai, they ranked 21st in the short and did not advance further.

Stefano Caruso joined Fusar-Poli as the duo's coach in the 2015–16 season. Silná/Kurakin reached the final segment at the 2016 Europeans in Bratislava and at the 2016 Worlds in Boston, where they placed 17th and 20th, respectively. They announced their retirement on 3 August 2016 due to Silná's back problems.

Post-competitive career 
Řezníčková has worked as a coach since retiring from competition. She has worked with the following skaters:
 Natálie Taschlerová / Filip Taschler
 Kateřina Mrázková / Daniel Mrázek
 Anna Šimová / Kirill Aksenov
 Maria Kazakova / Georgy Reviya
 Elisabetta Leccardi / Mattia Dalla Torre

Programs

With Kurakin

With Matsjuk

With Šubrt

Competitive highlights 
GP: Grand Prix; CS: Challenger Series; JGP: Junior Grand Prix

With Kurakin for Austria

With Matsjuk for Austria

With Šubrt for the Czech Republic

References

External links

Navigation

Czech female ice dancers
Austrian female ice dancers
1989 births
Living people
People from Kroměříž
Czech figure skating coaches